John McGreevy (11 May 1930 – 24 July 2011) was an  Australian rules footballer who played with Hawthorn in the Victorian Football League (VFL).

Notes

External links 

1930 births
2011 deaths
Australian rules footballers from the Australian Capital Territory
Hawthorn Football Club players